Steve Michael Beck is a former American commercial and film director.

Life and career 
Beck has directed commercials for First Union, GMC and Chevrolet, McDonald's and Gatorade.

He has spent several years working for Industrial Light & Magic (ILM) as a visual effects art director on films like Indiana Jones and the Last Crusade, The Abyss, and The Hunt for Red October.

As a filmmaker, he directed two feature films, Thirteen Ghosts and Ghost Ship, both for Dark Castle Entertainment.

Filmography 
 Director
 Thirteen Ghosts (2001)
 Ghost Ship (2002)

 Visual effects
 The Hunt for Red October (1990) (visual effects art director: ILM)
 The Abyss (1989) (effects art director: ILM)
 Indiana Jones and the Last Crusade (1989) (visual effects art director)

References

External links 
 

Living people
American film directors
Horror film directors
Visual effects artists
Place of birth missing (living people)
Year of birth missing (living people)